Corona Arch (formerly known as Little Rainbow Bridge) is a natural sandstone arch near Moab, Utah in a side canyon of the Colorado River west of Moab in Grand County, Utah, United States. It can be accessed via a  hiking trail (Corona Arch Trail) from Utah State Route 279 (Potash Road).

The arch is located within the same rock formation as Pinto Arch and Bowtie Arch.

This is the site of a rope swing shown on some YouTube videos. One titled, "World's Largest Rope Swing", has garnered more than 27 million views since it was posted February 15, 2012. Such videos have led to more people jumping from Corona Arch. On March 24, 2013, a man from Utah was killed due to miscalculating the distance to the ground before he swung from the arch. After much discussion, in 2015 a temporary ban was placed on rope-swinging from many arches.

See also

References

External links

 Natural Arch and Bridge Society article
  You Tube Video

Natural arches of Grand County, Utah
Natural arches of Utah